cadwork engineer is a transportation corridor building information modeling software developed beginning in 2004 by Cadwork informatik AG in Switzerland. Engineer is notable in that when combined with cadwork Lexocad, it is one of the few 'BIM' infrastructure softwares.

Technical characteristics 
An early adopter is Marti Group, which implemented cadwork Engineer in the BIM configuration on a civil engineering project in the Baselland Canton.

Engineer files are named with the extension .2dr.

Engineer includes modules:
 Roads
 Motorways
 Railways
 Junctions
 Roundabouts
 Point clouds
 Steel reinforcement
 Bridges
 Topography and maps
 Geographic information systems
 Theodolite interface

Engineer provides automatic calculations:
 Clothoid curves
 Three-radius curves for railway
 Horizontal and vertical jointures
 Truck trajectories
 Earth triangulation
 Retaining wall
 Earth Embankments
 Complex profiles with borders, banquettes, and dividers
 Topographic edits

Interfaces:
 Lexoview is guaranteed with Open Inventor format.
 AutoCAD is guaranteed with DWG format.

See also
Virtual design and construction
Industry Foundation Classes (IFC)
Civil engineering
Construction engineering

References

External links
 

 cadwork Engineer support forum

 cadwork ingenieur Youtube tutorials.

Data modeling
Road traffic management
Transportation engineering
Building information modeling
Construction software
Civil engineering
Building engineering software
Construction management
Computer-aided design software
3D graphics software
Computer-aided design software for Windows